Peavine Metis Settlement is a Metis settlement in northern Alberta, Canada within Big Lakes County. It is located on Highway 750 to the northeast of High Prairie.

Demographics 

The population of the Peavine Metis Settlement according to its 2018 municipal census is 566, a decrease from its 2015 municipal census population count of 639.

See also 
List of communities in Alberta
List of designated places in Alberta

References

External links 
Peavine Metis Settlement

Big Lakes County
Métis settlements in Alberta
Designated places in Alberta